Haldwani  railway station is a main railway station located in Haldwani in Nainital district of Uttarakhand State of India.

The station code is HDW and is 99 km from the headquarter of  the Izzatnagar railway division of North Eastern Railway Zone of Indian Railways. There are three platforms.  The single broad-gauge railway line uses the diesel engines.

It is located at 443m above mean sea level. The nearest airport is Pantnagar Airport at a distance of 28 km.

Major trains  
 Uttarakhand Sampark Kranti Express
 New Delhi–Kathgodam Shatabdi Express
 Jammu Tawi–Kathgodam Garib Rath Express
 Kanpur Central–Kathgodam Garib Rath Express
 Lucknow Junction–Kathgodam Express
 Kathgodam Express
 Ranikhet Express
 Bagh Express
 Kathgodam–Moradabad Passenger (via Kashipur) 
 Kathgodam–Moradabad Passenger
 Naini–Dun Jan Shatabdi Express Deharadun

References

Railway junction stations in India
Railway stations in Nainital district
Izzatnagar railway division
Transport in Haldwani-Kathgodam